Vepor Mountains are a mountain range in Slovakia, a subdivision of Erzgebirge in Spiš region.

Notable features
 Fabova hola
 Sihlianska plateau
 Balocké vrchy

See also
 Muránska planina National Park

Mountain ranges of Slovakia
Mountain ranges of the Western Carpathians